Elizabeth Willis (born April 28, 1961, Bahrain) is an American poet and literary critic.  She currently serves as Professor of Poetry at the Iowa Writers' Workshop. Willis has won several awards for her poetry including the National Poetry Series and the Guggenheim Fellowship.  Susan Howe has called Elizabeth Willis "an exceptional poet, one of the most outstanding of her generation."

Life
Willis grew up in the Midwestern United States and received her undergraduate degree from the University of Wisconsin–Eau Claire. She then earned a Ph.D. from the Poetics Program at University at Buffalo.

Willis has taught at several institutions including Brown University, Mills College, the University of Denver and Wesleyan University and has held residencies at the MacDowell Colony and the Centre International de Poésie, Marseille. Formerly the Shapiro-Silverberg professor of literature and creative writing at Wesleyan University, she currently serves as Professor of Poetry at the Iowa Writers' Workshop.

Willis has been awarded fellowships from the California Arts Council and the Howard Foundation and has won the National Poetry Series, the PEN New England Award and the Boston Review Prize for Poetry.  In 2012, she was awarded the Guggenheim Fellowship. Willis lives in Iowa City.

Work
As a poet, Willis employs the use of "hybrid genres," an attempt to "push the limits of representation." Turneresque, for instance, draws on elements as diverse as the Romantic sublime and film noir.  In terms of style, Willis is most often recognized for her "intense lyricism." Her poetry tends to center on the relationship between art and nature and has been noted for its musicality and precision.

Her literary criticism is concerned with 19th century and 20th century poetry and the ways in which changing technology comes to influence the production of poetry.  She also investigates the effects of public and private spaces in her prose.  Additionally, Pre-Raphaelite aesthetics and the relationship between contemporary poets and antecedent poets are also frequent concerns of her work.  Willis has dedicated a significant portion of her career to a study of the works of Lorine Niedecker.

Reception
Elizabeth Willis's poetry has been widely praised.  Jacket Magazine reported that Meteoric Flowers "offers the reader a strange and at times almost overwhelmingly pleasurable world." Poet Ron Silliman wrote that the collection "is filled with brief, well-balanced, brilliantly written prose poems." Susan Howe wrote, "Elizabeth Willis is an exceptional poet, one of the most outstanding of her generation, and Meteoric Flowers is her most compelling collection to date."  Rosmarie Waldrop said that the collection "is a remarkable investigation of our experience and language."

In a review of Turneresque, the Denver Quarterly reported that Willis "succeeds...in reinvesting language with the uniqueness of origin: the breath gesture of each letter."  Ann Lauterbach wrote that Willis "recovers the originating lyric impulse into a haunting contemporary song. This is poetry of amazing intelligence and grace."  Cole Swensen wrote, "What drives Willis’s incisive commentary into stunning poetry are her gorgeous lines...Despite a distinctly noir atmosphere and the unsettling quality that always attends the sublime, Turneresque comes off as affirmative, even jocularly courageous. It seems - to borrow one of its phrases - "to imply or intone whole possibility of human sun."

Of Address, Jeffrey Cyphers Wright wrote that the collection was "humorous, political, engaged, and deeply resonant."  Michael Palmer wrote that the book movingly engages "eternal issues." Alice Notley wrote that "Willis newly revives the list/litany form, and that works to the reader’s delight."

Reviewing Second Law, Susan Howe wrote, "The poems in Second Law are terse, precise, ecstatic and luminous. White letters serve as lures and traces through gaps of ordered scientific discourse, the rapture of the poet's will remains captive and rejoicing. In these linked fragmentary linguistic structures Elizabeth Willis enters Bunyan's emblematic river another time; singing."

Awards
 1994 National Poetry Series, for The Human Abstract
 Howard Foundation Fellowship
 PEN New England Award
 Residency at the MacDowell Colony
 2012 Guggenheim Fellowship
 2016 Pulitzer Prize for Poetry Finalist

Bibliography

Poetry 
Collections
 Alive: New and Selected Poems, New York Review Books, 2015.
 Address, Wesleyan University Press, 2011.
 
 Turneresque (Burning Deck, 2003)
 
 Second Law. Bolinas, CA : Avenue B, 1993. 9780939691081

List of poems

 "Vernacular Architecture"; "Madame Cézanne as Sainte-Victoire"; "The Oldest Garden in the World"; "Nocturne"; "Bohemian Rhapsody", Boston Review, November/December 2007
 [https://web.archive.org/web/20090813135417/http://www.conjunctions.com/archives/c28-ew.htm "Without Pity", Conjunctions 28, Spring 1997]
 "The Human Abstract", subtext
 "The Relation of the Lion to the Book is the Number 5 ", subtext
 "Envoi", subtext
 "Primeval Islands"; "Why No New Planets Are Ejected from the Sun"; "Oil and Water",  No: a journal of the arts, No. 3

 Criticism 
 "Who Was Lorine Niedecker?" American Poet, Academy of American Poets, 2006
 

References

External links
 Interview with Elizabeth Willis "'A Poem Argues for its Own Existence': An Interview with Elizabeth Willis" in Gulf Coast: A Journal of Literature and Fine Arts (25.1).
"Elizabeth Willis Homepage" at the Electronic Poetry Center
Ron Silliman on Meteoric Flowers poet Ron Silliman talks about Meteoric Flowers'' on his blog, entry for Monday, October 23, 2006
"Elizabeth Willis, PennSound

1961 births
Living people
21st-century American poets
American literary critics
Women literary critics
American women non-fiction writers
American women poets
The New Yorker people
University at Buffalo alumni
University of Wisconsin–Eau Claire alumni
Wesleyan University faculty
American women academics
21st-century American women writers
American women critics